In basketball, an assist is a pass to a teammate that directly leads to a score by field goal. The National Basketball Association's (NBA) assist title is awarded to the player with the highest assists per game average in a given season. The assists title was first recognized in the 1946–47 season when statistics on assists were first compiled by the Basketball Association of America (BAA), predecessor of the NBA. To qualify for the assist title, the player must appear in at least 58 games (out of 82). However, a player who appears in fewer than 58 games may qualify as annual assists leader if his assist total would have given him the greatest average, had he appeared in 58 games. This has been the requirement since the 2013–14 season.  The assists title was originally determined by assist total through the 1968–69 season, after which assists per game was used to determine the leader instead.

John Stockton holds the all-time records for total assists (1,164) and assists per game (14.54) in a season, achieved in the 1990–91 and 1989–90 seasons, respectively. Mark Jackson holds the rookie records for total assists and assists per game when he had 868 and averaged 10.6 in the 1987–88 season. Among active players, Chris Paul had the highest season assists total (925) in the 2007–08 season and Russell Westbrook had the highest season assists average (11.74) in the 2020-21 season.

Stockton has won the most assists titles in his career, with nine. Bob Cousy won eight assists titles, while Oscar Robertson won six. Jason Kidd, Chris Paul and Steve Nash have won five assists titles, while Kevin Porter and Magic Johnson, have each won four. Rajon Rondo, and Russell Westbrook have won three, while Andy Phillip and Guy Rodgers are the only other players to have won the title more than once. Stockton has also won the most consecutive assists titles, with nine. Four players have won both the assists title and the NBA championship in the same season: Cousy in 1957 and from 1959 to 1960 with the Boston Celtics; Jerry West in 1972 with the Los Angeles Lakers; Johnson in 1987 with the Lakers, and LeBron James with the Lakers in 2020.

Key

Annual leaders

Multiple-time leaders

Notes

References
General

Specific

National Basketball Association lists
National Basketball Association statistical leaders